TRT Haber (English: TRT News) is a Turkish news and current affairs television channel. It was listed by Anadolu Agency as the most watched news channel in May 2018.

See also 

 List of television stations in Turkey

References

External links 

  Official Website 
 TRT Haber Broadcasting Schedule
 Watch TRT Haber live Online

Television stations in Turkey
Turkish-language television stations
Television channels and stations established in 2010
2010 establishments in Turkey
24-hour television news channels in Turkey
Turkish Radio and Television Corporation